Calamotropha virginiae is a moth in the family Crambidae. It was described by Graziano Bassi in 2014. It is found in Mozambique.

References

Endemic fauna of Mozambique
Crambinae
Moths described in 2014
Moths of Sub-Saharan Africa
Lepidoptera of Mozambique